= South Australian Heritage Register =

Heritage register of buildings for the state of South Australia

The South Australian Heritage Register, also known as the SA Heritage Register, is a statutory register of historic places in South Australia. It extends legal protection regarding demolition and development under the Heritage Places Act 1993. It is administered by the South Australian Heritage Council.

As a result of the progressive abolition of the Register of the National Estate during the 2000s and the devolution of responsibility for state-significant heritage to state governments, it is now the primary statutory protection for state-level heritage-listed buildings and other sites in South Australia.

== See also ==
- National Trust of South Australia
